Claude Klotz (6 October 1932 in Marseille – 13 August 2010 in Paris), better known by his pen name Patrick Cauvin, was a French writer.

Works 
All of his works were published with Le Livre de Poche except when otherwise noted.
 1971: Les Innommables ("The Unspeakables"), under his real name Claude Klotz
 1977: E=mc² mon amour ("E=mc² my love")
 1982: Nous allions vers les beaux jours ("We went to the beautiful days")
 1982: Monsieur papa ("Mister Daddy")
 1982: L'amour aveugle ("Blind love")
 1983: Pourquoi pas nous ? ("Why not us?")
 1983: Huit jours en été ("Eight days in summer")
 1984: C'était le Pérou ("It was Peru")
 1985: Dans les bras du vent ("In the arms of the wind")
 1986: Laura Brams
 1987: C'était le pérou Tome II ("It was Peru volume II")
 1987: Haute-Pierre
 1988: Povchéri
 1990: Werther, ce soir... ("Werther, this evening...")
 1992: Rue des bons-enfants ("Street of the good children")
 1992: Kobar, Albin Michel
 1993: Belles galères ("Beautiful galleys")
 1995: Menteur ("Liar")
 1996: Tout ce que Joseph écrivit cette année là ("Everything Joseph wrote that year")
 1997: Villa Vanille
 1999: Théâtre dans la nuit ("Theatre in the night")
 1998: Présidente ("President")
 2001: Pythagore, je t'adore ("Pythagoras, I love you")
 2002: Torrentera
 2004: Le sang des roses ("The blood of roses")
 2004: Le silence de Clara ("The silence of Clara"), Albin Michel
 2005: Jardin fatal ("Fatal garden")
 2005: La reine du monde ("The queen of the world")
 2007: Belange
 2007: Venge-moi! ("Avenge me!")
 2008: Les pantoufles du samouraï ("The slippers of the Samurai")
 2008: La maison de l'été ("The house of summer"), éditions NiL
 2009: Déclic ("Click"), Plon
 2010: Une seconde chance ("A second chance"), Plon

Writers from Marseille
1932 births
2010 deaths
20th-century French novelists
21st-century French novelists
French male novelists
Prix Maison de la Presse winners
French crime fiction writers
French children's writers
French male screenwriters
French screenwriters
20th-century French male writers
20th-century French essayists
21st-century French essayists
French male short story writers
French short story writers
Deaths from cancer in France
21st-century French male writers
French male non-fiction writers